The Northern Vosges Regional Natural Park (French: Parc naturel régional des Vosges du Nord) is a protected area of woodland, wetland, farmland and historical sites in the region Grand Est in northeastern France. The area was officially designated as a regional natural park in 1976.

The rich natural landscape has been added to the UNESCO list of international biosphere reserves.

Northern Vosges PNR does not include any of the Vosges Mountains but rather the foothills just north of them. No part of it lies in the department of Vosges but rather it spans two other departments, Bas-Rhin and Moselle.

Gallery

Member communes
The following communes are members of Northern Vosges PNR:

In Bas-Rhin:

 Adamswiller
 Asswiller
 Butten
 Cleebourg
 Climbach
 Dambach
Dehlingen
Diemeringen
Domfessel
Dossenheim-sur-Zinsel
Drachenbronn-Birlenbach
Durstel
Eckartswiller
Erckartswiller
Ernolsheim-lès-Saverne
Eschbourg
Frœschwiller
Frohmuhl
Gœrsdorf
Hinsbourg
Hunspach
Ingolsheim
Ingwiller
Keffenach
Kutzenhausen
La Petite-Pierre
Lampertsloch
Langensoultzbach
Lembach
Lichtenberg
Lobsann
Lohr
Lorentzen
Memmelshoffen
Merkwiller-Pechelbronn
Morsbronn-les-Bains
Neuwiller-lès-Saverne
Niederbronn-les-Bains
Niedersteinbach
Oberbronn
Obersteinbach
Offwiller
Ottwiller
Petersbach
Pfalzweyer
Preuschdorf
Puberg
Ratzwiller
Reichshoffen
Reipertswiller
Retschwiller
Rosteig
Rothbach
Rott
Saint-Jean-Saverne
Schœnbourg
Soultz-sous-Forêts
Sparsbach
Struth
Tieffenbach
Volksberg
Waldhambach
Weinbourg
Weislingen
Weiterswiller
Wimmenau
Windstein
Wingen
Wingen-sur-Moder
Wissembourg
Wœrth
Zinswiller
Zittersheim

In Moselle:

 Baerenthal
 Bitche
 Bousseviller
 Breidenbach
 Éguelshardt
 Enchenberg
Epping
Erching
Goetzenbruck
Hanviller
Haspelschiedt
Hottviller
Lambach
Lemberg
Lengelsheim
Liederschiedt
Loutzviller
Meisenthal
Montbronn
Mouterhouse
Nousseviller-lès-Bitche
Obergailbach
Ormersviller
Phalsbourg
Philippsbourg
Rahling
Reyersviller
Rimling
Rolbing
Roppeviller
Saint-Louis-lès-Bitche
Schorbach
Schweyen
Siersthal
Soucht
Sturzelbronn
Volmunster
Waldhouse
Walschbronn

See also
 Palatinate Forest-North Vosges Biosphere Reserve
 List of regional natural parks of France

References

External links

 Official park website 

Regional natural parks of France
Geography of Bas-Rhin
Geography of Moselle (department)
Protected areas established in 1976
Tourist attractions in Bas-Rhin
Tourist attractions in Moselle (department)